"Ice Cream Castles" is the opening track from The Time's third album, Ice Cream Castle.  The track was one of the last songs recorded for the album, being cut in mid-January 1984, along with "My Drawers".  The song was composed by Prince and Morris Day, Day provided lead vocals and Jesse Johnson played guitar on the recording.  Prince played all the other instruments.

"Ice Cream Castles" is a laid-back funk-pop offering with drums to the fore.  The keyboards take an active role over a funky rhythm guitar and an understated organ solo is performed toward the end.  The song is about an interracial relationship that devolves into chants and band cues in the mainly instrumental extension.  The song's title is based on a lyric from Joni Mitchell, one of Prince's favorite singers.

The funky elements of the song allowed it to do well on the R&B charts, reaching #11, but it didn't break the top 100 on the pop charts.  Still, the song is occasionally still played in concert by The Time and a live recording from 1998 was also included on Morris Day's 2004 release, It's About Time.

The single was backed with the minimalist funk jam "Tricky", featuring Day on drums and Prince on the bass and keyboards taking humorous jabs at a washed-up singer (in reality, his idol George Clinton).  The UK 12" single also included the earlier hit "Get It Up", from The Time's debut album.

References

The Time (band) songs
1984 singles
Songs written by Prince (musician)
Song recordings produced by Prince (musician)
1984 songs
Warner Records singles